At least two ships of the French Navy have been named Tonkinois:

 , an  launched in 1917 and struck in 1936.
 , a  launched as HMS Moyola in 1942 and transferred to France in 1944.

French Navy ship names